Domiporta filaris, common name : the file mitre, is a species of sea snail, a marine gastropod mollusk in the family Mitridae, the miters or miter snails.

Description
The shell size varies between 14 mm and 55 mm

Distribution
This species occurs in the Red Sea, in the Indian Ocean off Chagos and the Mascarene Basin; in the Pacific Ocean offHawaii; and off Australia.

References

 Sheppard, A (1984). The molluscan fauna of Chagos (Indian Ocean) and an analysis of its broad distribution patterns. Coral Reefs 3: 43–50
 Drivas, J. & M. Jay (1988). Coquillages de La Réunion et de l'île Maurice

External links
 

Mitridae
Molluscs described in 1771
Taxa named by Carl Linnaeus